Artemisiospiza is a genus of birds in the American sparrow family, formally described by Klicka and Banks, 2011.

Species
It contains two species:

The two species historically comprised the sage sparrow complex, but were split in 2013 by the American Ornithological Society.

Both Artemisiospiza species inhabit dry areas of the western United States and northern Mexico.

References

 
Bird genera
American sparrows
Taxa named by John Klicka
Taxa named by Richard C. Banks